Brian Sampson may refer to:

 Brian Sampson (cricketer) (born 1945), New Zealand cricketer
 Brian Sampson (footballer) (born 1941), former Australian rules footballer
 Brian Sampson (racing driver) (born 1935), winner of the 1975 Bathurst 1000